The Timor rat (Rattus timorensis) is a species of rodent in the family Muridae found in Indonesian West Timor, where it lives in the teak forests. It is known from a specimen collected near the summit of Mount Mutis.

References

Rattus
Rats of Asia
Endemic fauna of Indonesia
Rodents of Indonesia
Mammals of Timor
Fauna of the Lesser Sunda Islands
Vulnerable fauna of Asia
Mammals described in 1991
Taxonomy articles created by Polbot